"Boom" is a special collaboration single with Filip Filippi, better known as Sin Sizzerb, a Serbian-Canadian rapper. It was part of the repackaged album of T-Pain's Three Ringz album, intended to be sold and distributed to the Philippines and Serbia.

Chart positions
"Boom" debuted at #14 on the Serbian Music Chart and also debuted at #8 on the MYX 2008 Year Ender Countdown in the Philippines, due to digital downloads in those countries. It was a certified hit in the Philippines as well as Serbia.

2008 singles
T-Pain songs
Song recordings produced by T-Pain
Songs written by T-Pain
2008 songs
Jive Records singles